The Silver Jubilee Independence Cup was a One Day International cricket tournament held in Dhaka, Bangladesh during January 1998. The tournament was held as a celebration of 25 years of Bangladesh's independence and all the games were held at Bangabandhu National Stadium, Dhaka, Bangladesh.India, Pakistan and the hosts Bangladesh were the participating teams in the tournament.

India were the winners of the tournament after beating Pakistan in the third final of the best of three finals. India successfully chased Pakistan's total of 314/5 in a match that, at the time, was a world record for the highest successful run chase in One Day International cricket. Hrishikesh Kanitkar hit a four ( Video )when 3 runs were required off the last two balls to help India chase down the record target and lift the Silver Jubilee Independence Cup.

Saurav Ganguly was awarded player of the match for his century in the third final, while Sachin Tendulkar was named the player of the series.

Tournament format
The sides played each other in a round robin, meaning that each side played two matches. The top two teams at the end of the round-robin stage played each other in Best of Three Finals.

Squads

The Pakistan Cricket Board announced a 14-member team for the tournament on 26 December 1997. Wicket-keeper-batsman Moin Khan, and pacemen Waqar Younis and Wasim Akram were dropped from the side that played the Champions Trophy. Akram had reportedly told the team's physiotherapist that he was "not fit" before leaving for England. Khan was replaced by Rashid Latif, who was made the captain, and Saeed Anwar the vice-captain. Other changes included exclusion of Akhtar Sarfraz and inclusion of Yousuf Youhana and Fazl-e-Akbar. The Bangladesh squad was announced on 7 January 1998. Many changes were made from the side that toured New Zealand that season. Spinner Shariful Haque, who last played in the 1994 ICC Trophy was included alongside Mohammad Rafique, who was returning after recovering from an injury. Shahriar Hossain, Khaled Mahmud and Zakir Hossain were other players included in the squad.

Points Table
India and Pakistan progressed to the best of three finals after finishing in the top two of the points table

Fixtures and results

Group stage

1st match

2nd match

3rd match

Finals

1st final

2nd final

3rd final

Statistics

Most runs

Most wickets

References

External links
 Tournament home at ESPN Cricinfo

One Day International cricket competitions
International cricket competitions from 1997–98 to 2000